Jorge Luis Corrales Cordero (born 20 May 1991) is a Cuban professional footballer who plays as a defender for USL Championship club FC Tulsa and the Cuba national team.

Club career
Corrales began his career in 2009, playing for FC Pinar del Río in his hometown of Pinar del Río. He was the captain of FC Pinar del Río from 2011 until 2015, when he was loaned to FC Sancti Spíritus. Corrales was named Pinar del Río's MVP in the 2012, 2013, and 2014 seasons. He tallied 20 assists and 6 goals during his more than 80 appearances for FCPR.

In 2015, Corrales obtained a US Visa from the U.S. Embassy in Havana and arrived in Miami to visit family and friends. Corrales joined amateur Miami-based Fortuna SC in October 2015. Fortuna SC had a strong Cuban contingent and included full Cuban senior international players Ariel Martinez and Dario Suarez, and under-23 internationals Brian Rosales, Frank López García and Yendry Torres.

While in Miami, he decided to initiate the necessary legal proceedings to obtain a work permit and legally live in the United States to pursue a professional soccer career. Following a successful tryout with Miami FC, he signed for the newly created team in January 2016. He joined Fort Lauderdale Strikers in June the same year. Corrales joined the Tulsa Roughnecks FC on 2 March 2017. He transferred to Chicago Fire in Major League Soccer on 14 September 2017.

On 7 August 2019, Corrales was traded to Montreal Impact in exchange for Micheal Azira and a second-round 2020 MLS SuperDraft pick.

International career
Corrales played in the 2011 CONCACAF U-20 Championship and the 2011 Pan American Games tournament.

He made his senior international debut for Cuba in a December 2011 friendly match against Costa Rica and has earned a total of 34 caps, scoring 1 goals. He represented his country in 7 FIFA World Cup qualifying matches

During the 2015 CONCACAF Gold Cup, Corrales played as a right back and center back during two of Cuba's three group stage matches.

International goals
Scores and results list Cuba's goal tally first.

Honours
Montreal Impact
 Canadian Championship: 2019

Cuba
 Caribbean Cup: 2012

References

External links

 
 
 
 

1991 births
Living people
Cuban footballers
People from Pinar del Río
Association football defenders
FC Pinar del Río players
FC Sancti Spíritus players
Miami FC players
Fort Lauderdale Strikers players
FC Tulsa players
Chicago Fire FC players
CF Montréal players
Major League Soccer players
North American Soccer League players
USL Championship players
Cuba international footballers
Cuba youth international footballers
Footballers at the 2011 Pan American Games
Pan American Games competitors for Cuba
2013 CONCACAF Gold Cup players
2014 Caribbean Cup players
2015 CONCACAF Gold Cup players
Defecting Cuban footballers
Cuban expatriate footballers
Expatriate soccer players in the United States
Cuban expatriate sportspeople in the United States